Oxysternon is a genus of Scarabaeidae or scarab beetles in the superfamily Scarabaeoidea. It can be distinguished from all other phanaeines and scarabaeine dung beetles by a long, spiniform extension of the anterior angle of the metasternum. Most taxa vary in color and color pattern, and are more commonly found in tones of green, often infused with yellow or coppery highlights. All species appear very smooth or glassy smooth to the unaided eye.

Taxonomy and nomenclature

The genus Sternaspis was proposed first by Hope in 1837, but the name was preoccupied and thus invalid. Laporte, writing under the pen name of Le Compte de Castelnau, proposed the genus Oxysternon to include several species of Phaneus-like species. O. festivum was later designated as the type species.

Phylogeny and evolution

The genus is monophyletic and its sister group is the genus Phanaeus. Two subgenera and two further species groups are recognized by some authors. It has been suggested that the current distribution of the species reflect vicariance events following climatic fluctuations in the Amazon.

Diversity

There are currently 11 species in the genus Oxysternon.

 Oxysternon conspicillatum Weber, 1801
 Oxysternon durantoni Arnaud, 1984
 Oxysternon ebeninum (Nevinson, 1890)
 Oxysternon festivum (Linnaeus, 1767)
 Oxysternon lautum (Macleay, 1819)
 Oxysternon macleayi (Nevinson, 1892)
 Oxysternon palaemon Laporte, 1840
 Oxysternon pteroderum Nevinson, 1892
 Oxysternon silenus Laporte, 1840
 Oxysternon spiniferum Laporte, 1840
 Oxysternon striatopunctatum Olsoufieff, 1924

Distribution

Oxysternon is a neotropical genus occurring north of the Tropic of Capricorn and east of the Andes. Only two, widespread species are found in the northwest of South America and up to the southern portion of Central America. Most Oxysternon species have restricted distributions within the Amazon basin, the Guiana Shield, the Cerrado region and the Atlantic coastal forest of Brazil.

Ecology
Oxysternon palaemon is a common beetle in the cerrado formations of Brazil and adjacent areas of Bolivia and Paraguay. All other species inhabit supermoist to mesic forest habitats with different degrees of tolerance to fragmentation and forest degradation.

The behavior of Oxysternon species has not been studied in detail. All species seem to be coprophagous or copro-necrophagous, although fruit pulp is sometimes used as an adult food resource.

References

Scarabaeidae